The 2014–15 season is Tractor's 6th season in the Persian Gulf Pro League. They will also be competing in the Hazfi Cup & AFC Champions League. Tractor is captained by Mehdi Kiani.

Club

Current coaching staff

Management

First Team Squad

Current squad

Transfers

Summer 

In:

Out:

Winter 

In:

 

Out:

Competitions

Overall

Competition record

Persian Gulf Pro League

Standings

Results summary

Results by round

Matches

Hazfi Cup

AFC Champions League

Group stage

Kit and sponsorship
Tractor is currently sponsored by the Hamrah-e Aval (Mobile Telecommunication Company) and also Javanane Khayer Foundation. They were previously sponsored by the Bank Sepah. In July 2014, the club signed a contract with Kelme, starting from 2014–15 season.

References

External links
Iran Premier League Statistics
Persian League

Tractor S.C. seasons
Tractor Sazi F.C.